Masłowice Tuchomskie  (Cashubian Tëchómsczé Masłowice, German: Gross Massowitz) is a village in the administrative district of Gmina Tuchomie, within Bytów County, Pomeranian Voivodeship, in northern Poland. For details of the history of the region, see History of Pomerania.

The village has a population of 143.

References

Villages in Bytów County